Kenwood is a neighborhood within the Calhoun-Isles community in Minneapolis along Lake of the Isles. The neighborhood is one of the most affluent in the city along with the nearby Lowry Hill neighborhood. The Kenwood neighborhood's most notable feature is the many historic mansions along the parkways overlooking the lake and the downtown skyline.

Its boundaries are Cedar Lake Parkway to the west, Kenwood Parkway to the north, West Lake of the Isles Parkway to the east, and Kenilworth Place to the south.

Notable residents

 Kenwood's most famous fictional resident was Mary Richards, played by Mary Tyler Moore, who resided at fictional "119 North Weatherly" and used exterior shots of the home located at 2104 Kenwood Parkway from 1970 to 1975 during the first five seasons of The Mary Tyler Moore Show.
Walter Mondale, Vice President of the United States, was a long time resident near Fremont Avenue.

References

External links
 Minneapolis Neighborhood Profiles - Kenwood
 Kenwood Neighborhood Organization
 Kenwood neighborhood map

Neighborhoods in Minneapolis